Four ships of the Royal Navy have borne the name HMS Nettle, after the stinging nettle, a species of flowering plants. A fifth was renamed before being launched.

  was a  wooden screw gunboat launched in 1856 and broken up in 1867.
 HMS Nettle was a target ship, formerly the 84-gun second-rate . She had been renamed Comet in 1869, Nettle in 1870, and was sold in 1901.
  was a tender, formerly the War Department's Pennar. She was transferred to the navy in 1905 and was sold in 1934.
She was renamed  before her launch in 1941.
She was renamed Nettle in 1941, and placed on the sale list in 1957.

See also
 

Nettle